No More Sleep is the second studio album by hard trance duo Cosmic Gate. It was released on July 8, 2002 in Germany.

Track listing

Charts

References

External links
 

Cosmic Gate albums
2002 albums